Thomas Willoughby, 4th Baron Middleton (19 December 1728 – 2 November 1781), was a British politician who sat in the House of Commons from 1762 to 1774, when he succeeded to the peerage as Baron Middleton.

Willoughby was the second son of Francis Willoughby, 2nd Baron Middleton. He was educated at Bury St Edmund's School, and entered Jesus College, Cambridge, in 1745.

Willoughby was returned unopposed as Member of Parliament for Nottinghamshire at a by-election on 13 December 1762. He was returned unopposed again at the general elections of 1768 and 1774.

When his brother died on 16 December 1774 he succeeded to the Barony and was called to the House of Lords.

He married Georgina, daughter of Evelyn Chadwick of West Leake, Nottinghamshire, in 1770 and lived in the family seat at Wollaton Park, Nottinghamshire. They had no children and was succeeded in the barony and estates by his cousin, Henry Willoughby, 5th Baron Middleton.

References

Middleton, Thomas Willoughby, 4th Baron
Middleton, Thomas Willoughby, 4th Baron
Middleton, Thomas Willoughby, 4th Baron
Members of the Parliament of Great Britain for English constituencies
British MPs 1761–1768
British MPs 1768–1774
British MPs 1774–1780
Thomas 4